Ingrid Stitt (born 1965/1966) is an Australian politician. She has been a Labor Party member of the Victorian Legislative Council since 2018, representing Western Metropolitan Region. She is a former union leader who won preselection over Jane Garrett in November 2017.

In September 2020, Stitt was appointed Minister for Workplace Safety and Minister for Early Childhood in the Second Andrews Ministry.

Stitt is a member of the Labor Left faction of the Labor Party.

Early life
Stitt was born in the United Kingdom and is the daughter of artists Peter and Daphne Stitt. In 1974, when Ingrid was 8, the Stitts moved to Australia when Peter took up a lecturing job at the Prahran College of the Arts in Melbourne.

References

Year of birth missing (living people)
Living people
Australian Labor Party members of the Parliament of Victoria
Labor Left politicians
Members of the Victorian Legislative Council
Victorian Ministers for the Environment
Women members of the Victorian Legislative Council
21st-century Australian politicians
21st-century Australian women politicians